Feyzi Ahsen-Böre (Tatar: Фәйзи Әхсән Бүре, Fäyzi Äxsän Büre; August 25, 1917 – 1975) was a Russian-born hockey player who played in Finnish team Ilves during 1934-1945, and won the championship three times. Ahsen-Böre came from a Tatar family and moved to Finland as a child but never acquired citizenship. He eventually became a citizen of Turkey. Ahsen-Böre lived in Istanbul since late 1940s. In there he operated a book store and published the first Finnish-Turkish dictionary. Father of Feyzi was the businessman Zinnetullah Ahsen Böre (né Imadutdinoff). Brothers of Feyzi (Murat, Zeyd, Vasif) all played hockey as well.

Career statistics

References

1917 births
1975 deaths
Turkish ice hockey players
Russian ice hockey players
Tatar people of Russia
Russian emigrants to Turkey
Ilves players
Russian expatriates in Finland